Joannes van Heymissen OCist (1621–1678) was the 36th abbot of Hemiksem Abbey.

Career 
Heymissen was born in 's-Hertogenbosch, which until 1629 was one of the four chief cities of the Duchy of Brabant in the Habsburg Netherlands. His father, an organist, later moved to Leuven, where Joannes was educated. He was related to the bishop of Antwerp, Mgr. Gaspard Nemius.

Heymissem completed his studies in philosophy at the University of Douai. In 1646 he entered the abbey of Hemiksem, and took his vows. He was unanimously elected abbot in 1660, following the death of Judocus Gillis. During his period as abbot the west front of the abbey, including the tower, were completed. However the abbey church was destroyed by a fire during works on the roof. He died in  died Burtscheid Abbey and was buried in the church of Hemiksem. He was succeeded as abbot by Antonius Spanoghe.

References

1621 births
1678 deaths
University of Douai alumni
Belgian Cistercians
Cistercian abbots
Abbots of the Spanish Netherlands